Pokhodsk is a rural locality (a selo) and the administrative center of Pokhodsky Rural Okrug of Nizhnekolymsky District in the Sakha Republic, Russia, located  from Chersky, the administrative center of the district. Its population as of the 2010 Census was 245, of whom 128 were male and 117 female, down from 271 recorded during the 2002 Census.

References

Notes

Sources
Official website of the Sakha Republic. Registry of the Administrative-Territorial Divisions of the Sakha Republic. Nizhnekolymsky District. 

Rural localities in Nizhnekolymsky District